LaSalle Annex is a historic multi-use commercial building located at South Bend, St. Joseph County, Indiana. It was built in 1925, and is a three to four-story, six bay by eight bay, building constructed of concrete, stone, and brick. It features an Italianate style tower and round arched openings.  It was originally built as a multi-use building containing stores, a parking structure, hotel rooms, bachelor apartments, and a variety of large recreational facilities including a roller rink, dance floor, and bowling alley. It was originally built as an annex to the LaSalle Hotel.

It was listed on the National Register of Historic Places in 1985.

References

Commercial buildings on the National Register of Historic Places in Indiana
Commercial buildings completed in 1925
Buildings and structures in South Bend, Indiana
National Register of Historic Places in St. Joseph County, Indiana